The Toronto Standard was an English language digital newspaper based in Toronto, Ontario, Canada. It was launched in 2010 to cover urban affairs, business, technology, culture and design. The company produces its own video content;  its 'Made In Toronto' video series has won awards for its quality.

The same name was used for a daily newspaper established in 1848.

Historical newspaper
The Toronto Standard newspaper was published in Toronto from 1848 to 1849. It is listed among Toronto's early newspapers as the Toronto Standard and General Advertiser. It was a weekly conservative newspaper, founded in 1848 and closed in 1849.

Modern digital newspaper
The Toronto Standard was among the very first websites to launch using adaptive response website design coding which enables users to automatically adapt the site to display on tablets and mobile devices. Six months after Toronto Standard was launched, the Boston Globe launched its website using the same responsive design programming.

Awards
In 2011 the Toronto Standard won three awards in the Canadian Online Publishing Awards: Gold for Best Website Design and Best Video/Multimedia, and Silver for Best Overall Online-Only Publication Website.
The Toronto Standard was nominated by the .net Awards in the UK for Site of the Year. Along with The New York Times and Vogue, the site won an Official Honoree Award in the 2012 Webby Awards.

In 2012 the Toronto Standard won two awards in the Canadian Online Publishing Awards: Gold for Best Website Design, beating out the Globe and Mail, National Post, and The Grid TO (a Toronto Star publication). It also won Silver for Best Online only publication just behind the CBC website.

In 2013 the Toronto Standard won first place in the Canadian Online Publishing Awards: Gold for Best Online-Only Publication Website beating out the "Huffington Post" and the "CBC".

As of June 2015, the outlet has not published new content.

References

External links
 Official website
 Daily Cable TV

Newspapers published in Toronto
Defunct newspapers published in Ontario
Publications established in 1848
Publications disestablished in 1849
Publications established in 2010
1848 establishments in Ontario
1849 disestablishments in Canada
2010 establishments in Ontario